Virginia Woodward Cloud (1861April 4, 1938) was an American writer.

Early life and education 
Virginia Woodward Cloud was born in 1861 in Baltimore, Maryland, the daughter of Maria (Woodward) and Daniel Cloud, a banker.

Career 
Cloud's writing career began in 1893. She was literary editor of the Baltimore News from 1906 to 1914 and a member of the board of the Woman's Literary Club of Baltimore. 

Cloud wrote poetry and short stories, some of which were about the colonial and revolutionary eras in American history. Some of her poems were written in "Negro dialect". She published in Harper's Magazine, The Century Magazine, and Atlantic Monthly.

Personal life 
Cloud was friends with Lizette Woodworth Reese. She died on April 4, 1938, aged 76 or 77, in Baltimore.

Books 
 Down Durley Lane and Other Ballads (1898)
 A Reed by the River (1902)
From an Old Garden (1922)
Candlelight (1924)
The Collected Poems of Virginia Woodward Cloud (1939)

References

Further reading 
 

1861 births
1938 deaths
19th-century American women writers
20th-century American women writers
Writers from Baltimore
Date of birth unknown